WKQK (1300 kHz) is a commercial AM radio station licensed to Cocoa Beach, Florida, and serving the Space Coast section of Florida. The station is owned by Will Standley, through licensee 321 Corporation.

WKQK features a full service adult contemporary radio format.  It is unique in that it features music only from local artists.  The station also airs frequent local news, community announcements, marine weather forecasts, airport arrival and departure info and high school sports.  The station is largely automated, with most announcements pre-recorded.   The studios, offices and transmitter are off Pluckebaum Road in Cocoa, Florida.

History
The station first signed on the air on June 22, 1959, as WRKT.  Because the station was near Cape Canaveral, those call letters stood for "Rocket."  On May 8, 1962, an FM station was added, with the call letters WRKT-FM (today WTKS-FM).

References

External links
FCC History Cards for WKQK

KQK
1959 establishments in Florida
Radio stations established in 1959
Full service radio stations in the United States